The Walsh Cup has been competed for since 1967 by the U.S. Naval Academy and Wisconsin Men's Varsity Eight rowing teams. Both teams compete in the Eastern Association of Rowing Colleges (EACR).

It is named after Commander Charles "Buck" Walsh, former coach of the U.S. Naval Academy crew.

References

College rowing competitions in the United States
College sports rivalry trophies in the United States
Navy Midshipmen rowing
Wisconsin Badgers rowing
Recurring sporting events established in 1967
1967 establishments in Maryland
1967 establishments in Wisconsin